Synechodes papuana is a moth in the family Brachodidae. It was described by John B. Heppner in 1990. It is found in New Guinea.

References

Arctiidae genus list at Butterflies and Moths of the World of the Natural History Museum

Brachodidae
Moths described in 1990